This is a list of some of the best known patter songs.

Pre-Gilbert and Sullivan

 Auber: Le domino noir – "Je suis sauvée enfin"
 Cornelius: Der Barbier von Bagdad – "Bin Akademiker, Doktor und Chemiker"
 Donizetti: L'elisir d'amore – "Udite, Udite, o rustici", middle section (Dulcamara)
 Donizetti: Don Pasquale – "Cheti, cheti, immantinente", final section (duet for Don Pasquale and Doctor Malatesta)
 Glinka: Ruslan and Lyudmila – Farlaf's Rondo «Близок уж час торжества моего» (Farlaf)
 Mozart: Marriage of Figaro – "La vendetta, oh, la vendetta", final section (Bartolo)
 Mozart: Don Giovanni – "Fin ch'han dal vino" (Don Giovanni)
 Mozart: Die Entführung aus dem Serail – "Solche hergelaufne Laffen", especially the final section of the aira (Osmin)
 Mozart: "Clarice cara mia sposa", aria for Tenor, K. 256
 Rossini: Il Barbiere di Siviglia – "Largo al factotum", final section (Figaro); "A un dottor de la mia sorte" (Bartolo)
 Rossini: La Cenerentola – "Sia qualunque delle figlie", final section (Don Magnifico)
 Rossini: "La Danza"
 Rossini: Il viaggio a Reims – "Medaglie incomparabili" (Don Profondo)
 Offenbach: La jolie parfumeuse –  "Neighbors Chorus"

Gilbert and Sullivan
 Arthur Sullivan and F. C. Burnand: Cox and Box – "My Master Is Punctual" (Mr. Cox)Eden and Saremba, p. 99
 Gilbert and Sullivan (referred to below as "Sullivan"): The Gondoliers – "In enterprise of martial kind" (Duke of Plaza-Toro, with Duchess, Cassilda and Luiz)
 Sullivan: The Gondoliers – "Rising early in the morning" (Giuseppe)
 Sullivan: H.M.S. Pinafore – "When I Was a Lad" (Sir Joseph)
 Sullivan: Iolanthe – "When you're lying awake" (the "Nightmare song"; Lord Chancellor)Williams, p. 23
 Sullivan: The Mikado – "As someday it may happen" (Ko-Ko)
 Sullivan: Patience – "If you want a receipt for that popular mystery" (Colonel Calverley)
 Sullivan: Patience – "If you're anxious for to shine" (Bunthorne)
 Sullivan: Patience – "So go to him and say to him" (Bunthorne and Lady Jane)
 Sullivan: The Pirates of Penzance – "I am the very model of a modern Major-General" (Major-General Stanley)
 Sullivan: Princess Ida – "If you give me your attention, I will tell you what I am" (King Gama)
 Sullivan: Ruddigore – "My boy, you may take it from me" (Robin)
 Sullivan: Ruddigore – "Henceforth all the crimes that I find in the Times" (Robin)
 Sullivan: Ruddigore – "My eyes are fully open to my awful situation" (Robin, Despard, and Margaret).
 Sullivan: The Sorcerer – "My name is John Wellington Wells" (J. W. Wells)
 Sullivan: Trial by Jury – "When I, good friends, was called to the bar" (the Learned Judge)Article and links about "The Judge's Song", The Victorian Web
 Sullivan: The Yeomen of the Guard – "I've Jibe and Joke. ... I've wisdom from the East and from the West" (Jack Point)
 Sullivan: The Yeomen of the Guard – "Oh! A private buffoon is a light-hearted loon" (Jack Point)

After G&S: selected showtunes

 Ashman & Menken: "Now (It's Just the Gas)" from Little Shop of Horrors Lionel Bart: "Reviewing the Situation" from Oliver! Cy Coleman: "Museum Song" from Barnum Comden & Green: "If" from Two on the Aisle Frankel & Korie: "The Revolutionary Costume" from Grey Gardens Rupert Holmes: "Both Sides of the Coin" from Drood Eric Idle: "You Won't Succeed on Broadway" from Spamalot Kander & Ebb: "The Money Song" from Cabaret Kander & Ebb: "We Both Reached for the Gun" from Chicago George Gershwin: "The Mophams" from Primrose George Gershwin: "It Ain't Necessarily So" from Porgy and Bess 
 Bock & Harnick: "Tonight at Eight" from She Loves Me Jerry Herman: "Penny in My Pocket" from Hello, Dolly! Jonathan Larson: "Therapy" from Tick, Tick... Boom! Lerner & Loewe: "Why Can't the English?", "I'm an Ordinary Man" and "A Hymn to Him" from My Fair Lady Roger Miller: "The Royal Nonesuch" from Big River Laurence O'Keefe: "Show You a Thing or Two" from Bat Boy: The Musical Cole Porter: "Let's Not Talk About Love" from Let's Face It! Stephen Schwartz: "All for the Best" from Godspell Sherman Brothers: "Supercalifragilisticexpialidocious" from Mary Poppins 
 Stephen Sondheim: "Another Hundred People" and "Getting Married Today" from Company Stephen Sondheim: "Now" from A Little Night Music Stephen Sondheim: "The Worst Pies In London" and "A Little Priest" from Sweeney Todd Stephen Sondheim: "Putting It Together" from Sunday in the Park with George Stephen Sondheim: "Mr. Goldstone, I Love You" from Gypsy Stephen Sondheim: "Your Fault" from Into the Woods Stephen Sondheim: "Franklin Shepard, Inc." from Merrily We Roll AlongJeanine Tesori: "The Speed Test" from Thoroughly Modern Millie adapts portions of  "My eyes are fully open" from Ruddigore Kurt Weill: "Tschaikowsky (and Other Russians)" from Lady in the Dark Meredith Willson: "Rock Island (opening sequence)" and "Ya Got Trouble" from The Music ManAfter G&S: selected popular and classical music
 Scrubs: "The Rant Song" from the 2007 episode "My Musical"
 Animaniacs: "Yakko's World" (1993), among others
 Barenaked Ladies: "One Week" from Stunt (1998)
 Billy Joel: "We Didn't Start the Fire" from Storm Front (1989)
 Noël Coward: "Mad Dogs and Englishmen" (1931)
Tom Lehrer: "The Elements" (1959) uses the tune of the "Major-General's Song"
 Lucky Starr: "I've Been Everywhere" (1959 by Geoff Mack)
 Phineas and Ferb: "History of the Tri-State Area", "I Really Don't Hate Christmas"
 Frank Zappa & The Mothers of Invention: "Let's Make the Water Turn Black" from We're Only in It for the Money'' (1968)

Notes

Sources

External links
Peter Schickele on the history of the patter song
Description of Nelson Eddy recording of patter songs, listing them
Description of Martyn Green recording of patter songs, listing them
List of some classical patter songs
Patter Song at TV Tropes

Lists of songs
Gilbert and Sullivan
 List